Le Juge is a Lucky Luke comic written by Goscinny and Morris. It is the thirteenth album in the Lucky Luke Series. The comic was printed by Dupuis in 1959 and by Cinebook in 2010 as The Judge. The story is inspired by the historical Justice of the peace Roy Bean. As usual, Lucky Luke does not interfere unless injustice is done, or one party acquires an unfair advantage over the other. Siding with Bean takes place only for that reason, to the level that things are fair game again. The unsung side-kick of the Judge is Jacinto, a diminutive Mexican, who lightens up several details of the story.

Synopsis 
While escorting a flock to Pecos, Luke is arrested by pseudo-judge Roy Bean, aided by his bear Joe.

Judge Roy Bean uses an old outdated Civil Code to apply the law in his own way. He gives everyone fines for stupid reasons (for example, he sentenced a Mexican named Jacinto to a month of forced labor simply because he had shaded him by the way). He also encourages people to make bets on the outcome, before confiscating the bets saying that betting and gambling are prohibited by law.

After a mock trial, the judge confiscates the cattle from Luke. The latter escapes and decides to ally himself with Bad Ticket, a man who also settles as a judge in Langtry. A war begins between the two judges and Luke decides to decide between them during a game of poker. Finally, Roy Bean capitulates after a game fraught with cheating and leaves Langtry.

However, Bad Ticket is even worse than Roy Bean and decides to hang Lucky Luke who only escapes with the help of Joe the bear. Finally, Luke, Roy Bean and Joe decide to team up against Bad Ticket. The latter locks them up. The prisoners manage nevertheless to escape, not without flooding the cellar where they were locked by digging a tunnel which lets in the water of the river.

Bad Ticket believes that they drowned. Some citizens, including Jacinto, see Luke and Roy Bean covered in flour, and take them for ghosts. This causes panic in Langtry while almost everyone believes that the city is haunted.

The citizens, discovering the responsibility of Bad Ticket, want to hang him with the undertaker (his accomplice). But Luke and Roy Bean (reluctant, but forced by Luke) come back to town and prove they are alive.

Roy Bean judges Bad Ticket and the undertaker and condemns them to leave Langtry and never return.

The army, called by Luke, arrives to arrest Roy Bean. However, there is no one in Langtry to judge him. Then, at Luke's request, Roy Bean judges himself and condemns himself to no longer be a judge.

Civilization and education arrive in Langtry and bandits leave. Lucky Luke recovers his cattle and takes them to Silver City.

Characters 

 Bad Ticket: Rival of the judge, he opens a saloon-court in front of the judge
 Roy Bean: Self-proclaimed "Judge", in fact illiterate, he will eventually join Lucky Luke against Bad Ticket
 Jacinto: Handyman of the judge's saloon
 Joe: Roy Bean's sidekick, even "auxiliary justice" when he is responsible for prosecuting a convict
 Mr. Williams: Teacher, he reassures residents when they believe the false ghost stories of the judge and Lucky Luke

References

 Morris publications in Spirou BDoubliées

External links
 Lucky Luke official site album index 

Comics by Morris (cartoonist)
Lucky Luke albums
1959 graphic novels
Works by René Goscinny
Cultural depictions of Roy Bean